"Saturday Night Live 40th Anniversary Special" (also billed as "SNL40") is a three-and-a-half-hour prime-time special that aired on February 15, 2015, on NBC, celebrating Saturday Night Lives 40th year on the air,  having premiered on October 11, 1975, under the original title NBC's Saturday Night. It is produced by Broadway Video. This special generated 23.1 million viewers, becoming NBC's most-watched prime-time, non-sports, entertainment telecast (excluding Super Bowl lead-outs) since the Friends series finale in 2004. It is the third such anniversary special to be broadcast, with celebratory episodes also held during the 15th and 25th seasons.

The special was preceded on NBC by an hour-long SNL 40th Red Carpet Live, hosted by Matt Lauer, Savannah Guthrie, Carson Daly and Al Roker, who interviewed past hosts, current and previous cast members, and musical legends who had previously performed on the show.

Synopsis
The special followed the format of a typical Saturday Night Live episode, extended to 3½ hours instead of the usual 1½, and included a cold open, a monologue, sketches, a short film, commercial parodies, and musical performances. The sketches, most of which were revivals of sketches that appeared over the show's run, made reference to the show and its four decades on air, with the original cast members who appeared in those sketches reprising their roles along with numerous guest stars. A handful of commercial parodies, including "Colon Blow" and "Mom Jeans", reran as they originally appeared on the show.

 Jimmy Fallon and Justin Timberlake appeared in the cold open, performing a "History of Rap"-esque musical number referencing famous sketches from the show's history. Rachel Dratch and Molly Shannon appeared as Debbie Downer and Mary Katherine Gallagher, respectively.
 Steve Martin performed the opening monologue, with featured appearances from Tom Hanks, Alec Baldwin, Melissa McCarthy, Chris Rock, Peyton Manning, Miley Cyrus, Billy Crystal, Paul McCartney, and Paul Simon, with the latter two performing an abbreviated duet of "I've Just Seen a Face".
 Dan Aykroyd and Laraine Newman appeared during the "Super Bass-O-Matic 2150" sketch, referencing a sketch originally done during the show's first season.
 Will Ferrell (as Alex Trebek), Darrell Hammond (as Sean Connery), Kate McKinnon (as Justin Bieber), Alec Baldwin (as Tony Bennett), Norm Macdonald (as Burt Reynolds), Taran Killam (as Christoph Waltz), Jim Carrey (as Matthew McConaughey), and Kenan Thompson (as Bill Cosby) appeared during the "Celebrity Jeopardy!" sketch.
 Pete Davidson and Leslie Jones introduced a montage featuring the auditions of current and former cast members, along with a few celebrities who never made the cast, including Jim Carrey, Stephen Colbert, Zach Galifianakis, and Kevin Hart.
 Fred Armisen, Vanessa Bayer, Bradley Cooper, Bill Hader, Taran Killam, Laraine Newman (reprising her Sherry the Valley Girl character), David Spade, Cecily Strong, Taylor Swift, Kenan Thompson, Kerry Washington, Betty White, and Kristen Wiig appeared during "The Californians/Total Bastard Airlines" sketch.
 Emma Stone (as Roseanne Roseannadanna), Edward Norton (as Stefon), Bill Hader (also as Stefon), Seth Meyers, Melissa McCarthy (as Matt Foley), and Bobby Moynihan (as the Land Shark) appeared during "Weekend Update", which was anchored by Jane Curtin, Tina Fey, and Amy Poehler.
 Norm Macdonald, Seth Meyers, Kevin Nealon, and Colin Quinn introduced a tribute to Chevy Chase, which also featured an appearance from Garrett Morris.
 Maya Rudolph (as Beyoncé) and Martin Short introduced a musical medley featuring appearances by Fred Armisen and Kristen Wiig (as Garth & Kat), Ana Gasteyer and Will Ferrell (as The Culps), Joe Piscopo (as Frank Sinatra), Dana Carvey (as Derek Stevens), Adam Sandler (as Opera Man), Kenan Thompson and Jason Sudeikis (as DeAndre Cole and Vance from the "What Up with That" sketches, alongside Cecily Strong and Sasheer Zamata as Poppy and Pippa), Steve Martin (as King Tut), Bill Murray (as Nick The Lounge Singer, alongside Paul Shaffer), and Dan Aykroyd and Jim Belushi (as The Blues Brothers).
 Jerry Seinfeld led the "Questions from the Audience" segment, which included cameos from Michael Douglas, John Goodman, James Franco, Larry David, Ellen Cleghorne, Dakota Johnson, Tim Meadows, Bob Odenkirk, and Sarah Palin (whom Seinfeld jokingly mistook for Tina Fey).
 Will Forte and Jason Sudeikis appeared during the "ESPN Classics" sketch (reprising their roles as Pete Twinkle and Greg Stink).
 Chris Rock introduced a tribute to Eddie Murphy, which marked Murphy's first appearance on the show since departing as a cast member in 1984.
 Louis C.K., Robert De Niro, Jack Nicholson, Derek Jeter and Peyton Manning introduced clips dedicated to pre-recorded sketches, New York City, politics, and sports, respectively.
 Bill Hader, Chris Parnell, Andy Samberg, and Adam Sandler appeared during the SNL Digital Short "That's When You Break", introduced by Zach Galifianakis.
 Mike Myers and Dana Carvey appeared in the Wayne's World sketch reprising their roles as Wayne Campbell and Garth Algar. The sketch also featured a cameo appearance by Kanye West.
 Steve Martin pulled Lorne Michaels up onstage as they began the famous SNL Goodbye to end the night with the rest of the entertainers.

The show included musical performances by:
 Paul McCartney, introduced by Keith Richards, Performed "Maybe I'm Amazed".
 Miley Cyrus, introduced by Candice Bergen and Win Butler, Performed "50 Ways to Leave Your Lover".
 Kanye West, introduced by Christopher Walken, Performed a medley of "Jesus Walks", "Only One", and "Wolves" (the latter with Sia and Vic Mensa).
 Paul Simon, introduced by Jack White, Performed "Still Crazy After All These Years".

In Memoriam
Bill Murray introduced an "In Memoriam" tribute to late SNL cast and crew members (which also included an obligatory mention of Francisco Franco).

The following were paid tribute to:

 Jan Hooks, cast member
 Elizabeth Karolyi, wardrobe
 Al Siegel, cue cards
 Don Pardo, announcer
 Bernie Brillstein, talent manager
 Al Camoin, camera operator
 Tom Davis, writer/performer
 Andy Kaufman, guest performer
 Danitra Vance, cast member
 Charles Rocket, cast member
 Tom Wolk, band
 Heino Ripp, technical director
 Dave Wilson, director
 Willie Day, prop master
 Phil Hartman, cast member
 Chris Farley, cast member
 Michael O'Donoghue, writer/performer
 Elliott Wald, writer
 Audrey Peart Dickman, coordinating producer
 Herb Sargent, head writer
 John Belushi, cast member
 Gilda Radner, cast member
 Jon Lovitz, cast member -- the inclusion of Lovitz in the segment was a joke, as he was alive and present in the audience. His shocked reaction is shown afterwards.

Guest appearances
This special assembled together a large list of current and former cast members, hosts, and musical acts from throughout the show's forty seasons. Show creator and executive producer Lorne Michaels stated that every host and most musical guests were invited, plus any cast member or writer who had been on the show more than a year. Ultimately, over a hundred in all were then confirmed to appear.

In the opening sequence, 81 performers were credited. Unlike a regular episode, all performers were credited as repertory: Fred Armisen, Dan Aykroyd, Alec Baldwin, Vanessa Bayer, Jim Belushi, Candice Bergen, Win Butler, Jim Carrey, Dana Carvey, Chevy Chase, Louis C.K., Ellen Cleghorne, Bradley Cooper, Billy Crystal, Jane Curtin, Miley Cyrus, Larry David, Pete Davidson, Robert De Niro, Michael Douglas, Rachel Dratch, Jimmy Fallon, Will Ferrell, Tina Fey, Will Forte, James Franco, Zach Galifianakis, Ana Gasteyer, John Goodman, Bill Hader, Darrell Hammond, Tom Hanks, Derek Jeter, Dakota Johnson, Leslie Jones, Taran Killam, Jon Lovitz, Norm Macdonald, Peyton Manning, Steve Martin, Melissa McCarthy, Paul McCartney, Kate McKinnon, Tim Meadows, Seth Meyers, Garrett Morris, Bobby Moynihan, Eddie Murphy, Bill Murray, Mike Myers, Kevin Nealon, Laraine Newman, Jack Nicholson, Edward Norton, Bob Odenkirk, Sarah Palin, Joe Piscopo, Amy Poehler, Colin Quinn, Keith Richards, Chris Rock, Maya Rudolph, Andy Samberg, Adam Sandler, Jerry Seinfeld, Paul Shaffer, Molly Shannon, Martin Short, Paul Simon, David Spade, Emma Stone, Cecily Strong, Jason Sudeikis, Taylor Swift, Kenan Thompson, Justin Timberlake, Kerry Washington, Kanye West, Betty White, Jack White, and Kristen Wiig.

Also in attendance were Arcade Fire, Tom Arnold, The B-52s, Backstreet Boys, Christine Baranski, Lance Bass, Beck Bennett, Michael Bolton, Jim Breuer, A. Whitney Brown, Steve Buscemi, Aidy Bryant, AJ Calloway, Kate Capshaw, 50 Cent, Dave Chappelle, Michael Che, Glenn Close, David Cone, Elvis Costello, Sheryl Crow, Alan Cumming, Carson Daly, Charlie Day, Rocsi Diaz, Leonardo DiCaprio, Diddy, Christopher Dodd, Jean Doumanian, Robin Duke, Nora Dunn, Christine Ebersole, Ari Emanuel, Siobhan Fallon, Paul Feig, Steve Forbes, Sen. Al Franken, Rudy Giuliani, Whoopi Goldberg, Jeff Goldblum, Cuba Gooding Jr., Gilbert Gottfried, Elliott Gould, Tom Green, Robert Greenblatt, Savannah Guthrie, Steve Guttenberg, Haim, Jon Hamm, Cheryl Hardwick (former SNL music director), Debbie Harry, Kevin Hart, Birgen Hartman (daughter of Phil Hartman), Sean Hayes, Grace Hightower, Melanie Hutsell, Victoria Jackson, Colin Jost, Jon Bon Jovi, Kim Kardashian, Chris Kattan, Tim Kazurinsky, Kings of Leon, Robert Klein, Kevin Kline, Johnny Knoxville, David Koechner, Jane Krakowski, Gary Kroeger, Frank Langella, Matt Lauer, Lucy Liu, Chris Lowell, George Lucas, Ludacris, Natasha Lyonne, Kyle MacLachlan, Eli Manning, Penny Marshall, Elaine May, MC Hammer, Dylan McDermott, John McEnroe, Bennett Miller, Finesse Mitchell, Kyle Mooney, Mumford & Sons, Randy Newman, Joanna Newsom, Don Novello, Bill O'Reilly, Cheri Oteri, Chris Parnell, David Paterson, Nasim Pedrad, Jay Pharoah, Ryan Phillippe, Prince, Brett Ratner, Jeff Richards, Brian L. Roberts, Al Roker, Paul Rudd, Horatio Sanz, Diane Sawyer, Rob Schneider, Jessica Seinfeld, Al Sharpton, Sia, Gabourey Sidibe, Sarah Silverman, J. K. Simmons, Christian Slater, Robert Smigel, G. E. Smith, J. B. Smoove, Trey Songz, Steven Spielberg, Julia Sweeney, Alex Trebek, Joe Torre, Donald Trump, Melania Trump, Christopher Walken, Sigourney Weaver, David Wells, Olivia Wilde, Fred Willard, Sasheer Zamata and Catherine Zeta-Jones.

Production
Of those former hosts, musical guests, former cast members and writers invited, the people who sent back an RSVP were then considered to be written for. Dan Aykroyd was asked by Lorne Michaels about doing a "Bass-O-Matic" sketch, while Mike Myers and Dana Carvey requested to reprise Wayne's World. Michaels stated that since different generations of former cast members were coming, they wanted to do sketches featuring mashups between different casts.

Writer Jim Downey conceived the idea of Nick the Lounge Singer singing the theme to Jaws way back in the 1970s, but was never able to pull it off during Bill Murray's tenure on SNL. They were unsure if they could obtain the necessary copyright clearance to show footage of Jaws on a monitor in the background until they realized that, since NBC had already acquired the rights to Jaws with its purchase of Universal Pictures in 2002, they could just ask director Steven Spielberg, who was in attendance.

Eddie Murphy was originally asked to play Bill Cosby in the "Celebrity Jeopardy!" sketch, but refused.

Nora Dunn was asked to participate in the musical medley as Liz Sweeney, but refused because Jan Hooks (the other Sweeney Sister) had died.

NSYNC were scheduled to appear in this special but their appearance was cancelled by last minute.

Marketing and promotion 
A 15-second spot premiered during the Super Bowl XLIX broadcast and – along with two other 15-second clips – was uploaded on to the official Saturday Night Live YouTube page. While the clips promoted appearances by Jon Hamm and Paul Rudd, neither of these occurred during the live show. Numerous articles, features and interviews were published in the weeks prior to the broadcast.

VH1 Classic aired a 19-day marathon of SNL-related programming that ended on the day of the special, featuring notable episodes in a reverse chronological order (alongside theme blocks focusing on specific cast members, and films featuring them), concluding with the original series premiere.

Ratings 
The special gained 23.1 million viewers, becoming NBC's most-watched prime-time, non-sports, entertainment telecast (excluding Super Bowl lead-outs) since the Friends series finale in 2004.

References

2010s American television specials
2015 in American television
2015 in New York City
2015 television specials
Anniversary television episodes
Television series reunion specials
American live television shows
NBC television specials
Saturday Night Live in the 2010s
Television shows directed by Don Roy King